Ek Anek Aur Ekta or "One, Many, and Unity" (also known as Ek Chidiya, Anek Chidiyan after the title song) is a traditionally animated short educational film released by the Films Division of India (Government of India). It was released in 1974. It was aired on the public broadcaster channel Doordarshan and became very popular among children.

Summary 

The film was intended to teach the value of unity and teamwork to children (Unity in Diversity). It also contains the message of how India is stronger if its citizens stand united, regardless of cultural differences. It begins with a group of children playing in a garden with one of them asking his elder sister, "Didi, yeh anek kya hota hai?", or in English, "Sis, what do you mean by Many?". The rest of the film is the sister's reply, using a metaphorical story of how a group of birds escape a bird catcher by uniting to recruit their friends, a group of mice.

The team 

The film was directed by Vijaya Mulay and Bhimsain. The film's design, animation and creation was done by Bhimsain. The lyrics of Hind Desh ke Niwasi were written by Pandit Vinay Chandra Maudgalya. Sadhna Sargam  sang Ek Chidiya, Anek Chidiyan. The assistants were S.M. Hasan, Mahesh Taavre and Girish Rao. The film won the National Film Award for Best Educational Film., and it was the first film from the animation studios of then Center for Education Technology. The film also won the Best Children's Film award in Japan. The film is considered to be one of India's greatest examples of animation story-telling, and well remembered by the 80s generation as a classic illustration of Anekta mein Ekta.

References

External links 

 
 

1974 films
Indian documentary films
1970s animated short films
Indian animated short films
1970s Hindi-language films
1974 animated films